The Democratic Confederation of Workers of Niger (CDTN) is a trade union in Niger, formed as a breakaway from the Union of Workers' Trade Unions of Niger.

See also

Trade unions in Niger
Union of Workers' Trade Unions of Niger

References

Trade unions in Niger
Breakaway trade unions
Trade unions established in 2001